This is a list of both current and former programs aired on Ekushey Television, a privately owned Bangladeshi television channel.

Original programming 
 Ajker Shongbadpotro
 Amrao Boltey Chai
 Atopar Ami
 Bandhan
 Baundule Express
 Bhabi
 Bideshi Para
 Bish Kata
 Bubuner Baba
 Channel 21
 Chirontony
 Choturongo
 Cine Hits
 Deshjure
 Drishti
 Durer Manush
 Ei Shoptaher Biswa
 Ekatturer Ei Diney
 Ekushey Business
 Ekusher Chokh
 Ekusher Dupur
 Ekushey Dupur (News)
 Ekushey, Pothey Pothey
 Ekusher Raat
 Ekushey Shongbad
 Ekusher Sokal
 Ekusher Sondha
 Ghorar Dim
 Ghotok Ebong Amra
 Golpo Solpo Gaan
 Hakarobin
 Ishkool
 Jahur Ali Jahuri
 Kenakata
 Media Gossip
 Mukto Khabor
 O Bondhu Amar
 Onneshon
 Pather Panchali
 Phono Live Studio Concert
 Priyotomashu
 Radhunir Rannaghar
 Shabdo Jabdo
 Shofol Jara Kemon Tara
 Shoshur Bari Zindabad
 Shukhi Manush Project
 The Diplomats
 Three Comrades
 Tobuo Badhan
 Tuntuni Villa
 Virgin Takdum Takdum

Acquired programming 
 Alif Laila
 Blue Whale
 Gul Sanobar
 Hatim
 Life on Earth: A Natural History
 Looney Tunes and Merrie Melodies
 Popeye the Sailor
 Shimanter Sultan
 Supernatural: The Unseen Powers of Animals
 The Adventures of Montu Miah
 The Blue Planet: Seas of Life
 The Life of Mammals
 Thief of Baghdad
 ThunderCats
 Turbulence of the Mu Clan
 WWE
 Zoo Quest

References 

Bangladeshi television-related lists
Lists of television series by network